Along These Lines is a 1974 Canadian short documentary film directed by Peter Pearson. A history of the telephone, the film was sponsored by Bell Canada to mark the 100th anniversary of the telephone's invention by Alexander Graham Bell in 1874. It was produced by Patrick Watson and animated by George Dunning.

It won the Canadian Film Award for Best Theatrical Short Film at the 26th Canadian Film Awards.

References

External links
Along These Lines at the Canadian Educational, Sponsored, and Industrial Film (CESIF) Project, Concordia University

1974 films
Canadian short documentary films
1970s short documentary films
Best Theatrical Short Film Genie and Canadian Screen Award winners
1970s English-language films
1970s Canadian films